5 A.M. may refer to:
A time on the 12-hour clock

Music

Albums
5AM, album by The Confusions 2006
5AM, album by Skipp Whitman 2012
5:00 AM, album by Adrian Borland
5am (album), by Amber Run

Songs
"5 AM (song)", song by Katy B
"5AM", song by James Yorkston from The Year of the Leopard 2007 
"5AM", song by Logic from Young Sinatra: Welcome to Forever, 2013
"5AM", song by Hamilton Leithauser from Black Hours (album) 2014
"5AM", song by hip hop group Lost Boyz from LB IV Life
"5AM", song by The Ballroom from Magic Time (compilation album)   2001
"5AM (A Love Song)", song by Blue Rodeo from Casino (Blue Rodeo album)
"5 A.M.", song by David Gilmour from Rattle That Lock 2015

See also
5 After Midnight, British boy band (formerly called 5AM)
5 o'clock (disambiguation)
"Five in the Morning", a song by A from How Ace Are Buildings

Date and time disambiguation pages